Edgaras Ulanovas (born January 7, 1992) is a Lithuanian professional basketball player for Žalgiris Kaunas of the Lithuanian Basketball League (LKL) and the EuroLeague. He primarily plays at the small forward position.

Professional career
On 25 April 2014, Ulanovas was named the Co-VTB United League Young Player of the Year, along with Dmitry Kulagin. In 2017, he was named the MVP of the 2017 King Mindaugas Cup, and also the MVP of the 2017 LKL Finals.

In 2019, Ulanovas was named the LKL Finals MVP for a second time in his career.

In 2020, Ulanovas was named MVP of the 2020 King Mindaugas Cup.

On 9 July 2020, Ulanovas transferred to the Turkish EuroLeague powerhouse Fenerbahçe, after a full decade with Žalgiris. During his first game as a member of the new team in the EuroLeague, Ulanovas was one of the team leaders by scoring 13 points, and helped his team to achieve a 77–63 season opening victory versus the KK Crvena zvezda. On 15 June 2021, Ulanovas officially parted ways with the Turkish club.

On 2 July 2021, Ulanovas returned to Žalgiris Kaunas, signing a one-year deal. On 10 April 2022, he re-signed with the club until the end of the 2023–24 season.

National team career

Lithuanian junior national team
Ulanovas represented Lithuania's junior national teams at the 2008 FIBA Europe Under-16 Championship, the 2010 FIBA Europe Under-18 Championship, the 2011 FIBA Under-19 World Cup, and the 2012 FIBA Europe Under-20 Championship, winning four gold medals. In the 2012 FIBA Europe Under-20 Championship, he was named to the All-Tournament Team.

Lithuanian senior national team
In 2015, Ulanovas was included into the senior Lithuanian national team's extended candidates list, by the team's head coach, Jonas Kazlauskas. However, he was not invited into the team's training camp later on. Still, he was invited into the national team's training camp the next year, and he immediately qualified into the Olympic roster.

However, he was replaced on the roster by Vaidas Kariniauskas, just before the start of the tournament, due to injury. Following year, Ulanovas played with the team at the EuroBasket 2017, averaging 7.2 points.

Career statistics

EuroLeague

|-
| style="text-align:left;"| 2014–15
| style="text-align:left;" rowspan=6| Žalgiris Kaunas
| 24 || 12 || 19.2 || .465 || .323 || .757 || 2.5 || 1.2 || .6 || .0 || 5.5 || 5.9
|-
| style="text-align:left;"| 2015–16
| 24 || 24 || 26.8 || .372 || .342 || .875 || 4.5 || 2.0 || .7 || .2 || 6.3 || 9.2
|-
| style="text-align:left;"| 2016–17
| 30 || 16 || 24.4 || .510 || .381 || .877 || 3.3 || 1.5 || .3 || .3 || 7.7 || 9.3
|-
| style="text-align:left;"| 2017–18
| 35 || 31 || 27.1 || .503 || .457 || .787 || 4.1 || 2.1 || .5 || .4 || 7.5 || 10.9
|-
| style="text-align:left;"| 2018–19
| 34 || 24 || 24.9 || .439 || .354 || .840 || 3.4 || 1.4 || .6 || .2 || 7.2 || 8.6
|-
| style="text-align:left;"| 2019–20
| 28 || 28 || 25.4 || .427 || .368 || .813 || 3.3 || 2.0 || .4 || .1 || 8.3 || 8.9
|-
| style="text-align:left;"| 2020–21
| style="text-align:left;"| Fenerbahçe
| 28 || 28 || 19.1 || .471 || .400 || .722 || 1.6 || 1.4 || .3 || .0 || 4.5 || 4.9
|-
| style="text-align:left;"| 2021–22
| style="text-align:left;"| Žalgiris Kaunas
| 32 || 24 || 27.4 || .441	 || .347 || .789 || 4.3 || 2.0 || .8 || .2 || 8.1 || 10.2
|- class="sortbottom"
| colspan=2 align=center | Career
| 235 || 187 || 24.3 || .455 || .371 || .818 || 3.4 || 1.7 || .5 || .2 || 7.0 || 8.8

References

External links
 Edgaras Ulanovas at eurobasket.com
 Edgaras Ulanovas at euroleague.net
 Edgaras Ulanovas at fiba.com

1992 births
Living people
2019 FIBA Basketball World Cup players
Basketball players from Kaunas
BC Lietkabelis players
BC Neptūnas players
BC Pieno žvaigždės players
BC Žalgiris players
Fenerbahçe men's basketball players
Lithuanian men's basketball players
Lithuanian people of Russian descent
LSU-Atletas basketball players
Small forwards